A Warrior's Heart is an American 2011 romantic sports drama film directed by Michael F. Sears and written by Martin Dugard. It stars Kellan Lutz, Adam Beach, Gabrielle Anwar and Ashley Greene. 

The film was released at the 2011 Cannes Film Festival on May 13, 2011 and in limited theaters on December 2, 2011.

Plot summary
Star Lacrosse player Conor Sullivan is not excited about moving to an unknown town and being the new kid at high school. He has a new love interest Brooklyn, but he struggles to find a meaning to his life.

Conor's Marine father Seamus is redeployed into Iraq where he dies in combat leaving Conor in shock and denial as he starts acting out in self-destructive ways. This greatly worries his mother Claire. There is also a violent on-field clash with ahis long-time nemesis, Dupree, and a vandalism incident that lands him in a jail cell and finally gets him kicked off the team. To regain his obvious passion for the sport, he goes for arduous training in a wilderness Lacrosse camp. The camp is under the tutelage of his dead father's old combat buddy, Sgt. Major Duke Wayne, who opens Conor's eyes to the true meaning of maturity, sportsmanship and manhood.

Cast

Kellan Lutz as Conor Sullivan
Adam Beach as Sgt. Major Duke Wayne
Ashley Greene as Brooklyn
Gabrielle Anwar as Claire Sullivan
Chord Overstreet as Dupree
William Mapother as David Milligan
Aaron Hill as Joe Bryant
Chris Potter as Lt. Col Seamus 'Sully' Sullivan
Jay Hayden as JP Jones
Ridge Canipe as Keegan Sullivan
Daniel Booko as Powell

Release
The film was presented at the 2011 Cannes Film Festival on May 13, 2011.  It had a limited release in the United States on December 2, 2011.

Critical reception
Review aggregator Rotten Tomatoes reports that 17% of 12 critics have given the film a positive review, with an average rating of 3.4 out of 10.

References

External links
A Warrior's Heart Official website (archived May 2012)

2011 films
Lacrosse films
Films with screenplays by Martin Dugard (author)
2010s English-language films